The Dallas Morning News is a daily newspaper serving the Dallas–Fort Worth area of Texas, with an average print circulation of 65,369. It was founded on October 1, 1885 by Alfred Horatio Belo as a satellite publication of the Galveston Daily News, of Galveston, Texas. Historically, and to the present day, it is the most prominent newspaper in Dallas.

Today it has one of the 20 largest paid circulations in the United States. Throughout the 1990s and as recently as 2010, the paper has won nine Pulitzer Prizes for reporting and photography, George Polk Awards for education reporting and regional reporting, and an Overseas Press Club award for photography. The company has its headquarters in downtown Dallas.

History

The Dallas Morning News was founded in 1885 as a spin-off of the Galveston Daily News by Alfred Horatio Belo. In 1926, the Belo family sold a majority interest in the paper to its longtime publisher, George Dealey. By the 1920s, the Dallas Morning News had grown larger than the Galveston Daily News and become a progressive force in Dallas and Texas. Adolph Ochs, who saved the New York Times from bankruptcy in 1896 and made the newspaper into one of the country's most respected, said in 1924 that he had been strongly influenced by the Dallas Morning News.

During the 1920s, when the Ku Klux Klan was a powerful force in Dallas, the Dallas Morning News pushed back against the KKK with its news coverage and editorials. In turn, the KKK, which had a membership that included one in three eligible Dallas men, threatened to boycott the newspaper. 

In 1904, The Dallas Morning News began publishing the Texas Almanac, which had previously been published intermittently during the 1800s by the Galveston Daily News.  After over a century of publishing by the Morning News, the Almanac's assets were gifted to the Texas State Historical Association in May 2008.

By the late 1940s, the Morning News had built and opened a new office, newsroom, and printing plant at Houston and Young Streets on the southwest side of downtown Dallas.  A notable part of the facade above the front doors includes a quote etched in the stony exterior:
BUILD THE NEWS UPONTHE ROCK OF TRUTHAND RIGHTEOUSNESSCONDUCT IT ALWAYSUPON THE LINES OFFAIRNESS AND INTEGRITYACKNOWLEDGE THE RIGHTOF THE PEOPLE TO GETFROM THE NEWSPAPERBOTH SIDES OF EVERYIMPORTANT QUESTIONG. B. DEALEY
The complex at 508 Young Street would house all or part of the Morning News operations for the next six decades.

In late 1991, The Dallas Morning News became the lone major newspaper in the Dallas market when the Dallas Times Herald was closed after several years of circulation wars between the two papers, especially over the then-burgeoning classified advertising market. In July 1986, the Times Herald was purchased by William Dean Singleton, owner of MediaNews Group. After 18 months of efforts to turn the paper around, Singleton sold it to an associate. On December 8, 1991, Belo Corporation bought the Times Herald for $55 million, closing the paper the next day.

It was not the first time the Belo family had bought (and closed) a paper named The Herald in Dallas.

In 2003, a Spanish-language newspaper was launched by The Dallas Morning News, called Al Día.  Initially Al Día came with a purchase price, but in recent years the newspaper has been made available free of charge.  It is published twice a week, on Wednesday and Saturday.

Between 2003 and 2011, a tabloid-sized publication called Quick was published by The Dallas Morning News, which initially focused on general news in a quick-read, digest form, but in later years covered mostly entertainment and lifestyle stories.

In late 2013, The Dallas Morning News ended its longtime newsgathering collaboration with previously-co-owned TV station WFAA.  The newspaper entered into a new partnership with KXAS at that time.

Historically, the Morning News''' opinion section has tilted conservative, mirroring Texas′ drift to the Republican Party since the 1950s.  However, on September 7, 2016 it endorsed Hillary Clinton for president, the first time it had recommended a Democrat for president since Franklin D. Roosevelt in 1940.   This came a day after it ran a scathing editorial declaring Republican candidate Donald Trump "not qualified to serve as president."  It was the first time that the paper had refused to recommend a Republican since 1964. Then, in wake of the approaching 2018 midterm elections, the Morning News once again endorsed a Democratic candidate: Beto O'Rourke, the challenger to incumbent Senator Ted Cruz.

In late 2016, it was announced that The Dallas Morning News would move away from its home of 68 years on Young Street, to a building on Commerce Street previously used by the Dallas Public Library for its downtown branch.  The Commerce Street address is one-third the size of the Young Street complex.  Reasons given for the move included technology innovations, fewer staff, as well as printing presses no longer co-located with the newsroom and main offices (printing is done now mainly at a facility in Plano, north of Dallas).Karen Robinson-Jacobs, "Dallas Morning News parent signs lease for crosstown move to Statler", The Dallas Morning News, January 2, 2017.  Retrieved 2018-12-10.  By December 2017, the move was completed.  The former property at 508 Young was sold by October 2018 to a business partnership, which was looking into possible redevelopment opportunities for the complex,Claire Ballor, "Former home of Dallas Morning News to sell for $33M", Dallas Business Journal, October 30, 2018.  Retrieved 2018-12-10. but in December 2018 the partnership backed out of the deal.

Changes were announced in January 2019 which included staff layoffs (including editorial, arts/culture, and business) and reducing the paper's Business section to one separate section per week, on Sunday; the remainder of the week, Business coverage would be found in the paper's Metro section.  A total of 43 employees were affected by the move.

In late February 2019, several printing agreements were not renewed at the Morning News suburban printing plant, and 92 positions were affected by the change there.  Publications that had to find a different printing partner included Dallas Observer and Fort Worth Weekly.

Awards
 

 Pulitzer Prizes 
 1986: National Reporting
 1989: Explanatory Journalism
 1991: Feature Photography
 1992: Investigative Reporting
 1993: Spot News Photography
 1994: International Reporting
 2004: Breaking News Photography
 2006: Breaking News Photography
 2010: Editorial Writing

 George Polk Awards 
 1990: Gayle Reaves, David Hanners, and David McLemore for regional reporting
 1994: Olive Talley for education reporting

 Overseas Press Club Awards 
 2001: Cheryl Diaz Meyer for photographic reporting from abroad

 National Headliner Awards 
 2017:"83rd National Headliner Awards winners", headlinerawards.org, April 2017.  Retrieved 2019-01-15.
 Spot News in Daily Newspapers (first place)
 Local Interest Column on a Variety of Subjects (first place - Jacquielynn Floyd)
 Special or Feature Column on One Subject by an Individual (third place - Chris Vognar)
 Editorial Writing by an Individual or Team (first place - Sharon Grigsby, Michael Lindenberger, and James Ragland; third place - Sharon Grigsby)
 Sports Column by an Individual (second place - Kevin Sherrington)
 Sports Writing by an Individual or Team (third place - Matt Wixon, Michael Florek, and Gregg Riddle)
 Business News Coverage, Business Commentary and/or Business Columns by an Individual or Team (third place - Mitchell Schnurman)
 Newspaper Spot News Photography (second place - Ting Shen)
 Newspaper Feature Photography (second place - Tom Fox)
 Newspaper Sports Photography (second place - Smiley N. Pool)
 Photography Portfolio (second place - Smiley N. Pool)
 Photo Essay/Story (first place)
 Newspaper/Magazine Illustration or Informational Graphics by an Individual or Team (second place)

 Katie Awards, Press Club of Dallas 
 2005:
 Buck Marryat Award, career journalism excellence (Bob Mong)
 Feature Story, Major Market Newspapers (Jacquielynn Floyd)
 Investigative Reporting, Major Market Newspapers (Joshua Benton and Holly K. Hacker)
 Government/Political Story, Major Market Newspapers (Pete Slover)
 Sports Story, Major Market Newspapers (Bill Nichols)
 Sports Column, Major Market Newspapers (Kevin Sherrington)
 Newspaper News Page Layout
 Best News Website
 Best Website Content
 Best Website Graphics
(The Morning News' Al Día newspaper received awards for General News Story, Best Feature Story, and Best Spanish Language Newspaper, as well.)

 2008:
 Business Reporting, Large Newspapers (first place - Jim Landers and Elizabeth Souder; third place - Sheryl Jean)
 Best Column, Large Newspapers (second place - Rawlins Gilliland; third place - Catherine Cuellar)
 Best Feature, Large Newspapers (first place - Steve Thompson; second place - Emily Ramshaw)
 Best Investigative Series/Story, Large Newspapers (first place - Brooks Egerton and Reese Dunklin)
 Best Series, Large Newspapers (first place - Doug J. Swanson, Steve McGonigle, Gregg Jones, Jennifer LaFleur, Emily Ramshaw, Holly Becka; second place - David Tarrant)
 Best Specialty Reporting, Large Newspapers (first place - Robert T. Garrett; third place - Thor Christensen)
 Best Sports Reporting, Large Newspapers (first place - Barry Horn; second place - Evan Grant; third place - Brad Townsend)
 Best Headline Writing, Large Newspapers (first place - Linda Johnson)
 Best Website
 Photographer of the Year (first place - Mona Reeder)
 Best Blog (first place and second place)

 Hugh Aynesworth Awards, Press Club of Dallas 
 2018:
 Daily Newspaper Investigative Reporting (Cary Aspinwall)
 Public Service (Cary Aspinwall)
 Daily Newspaper Feature Reporting (Frank L. Christlieb)
 Sports Feature Reporting (Michael Florek)

See also

 List of newspapers in Texas
 Fort Worth Star-Telegram

References

Further reading

 Alt URL

External links
 
 Sports Day DFW, further sports news coverage
Guidelive, news/listings of local entertainment/eventsAl Día Spanish-language newspaper
 Archive of The Dallas Morning News issues (1885-1984) at NewsBank
 "Behind the Pages", look behind the scenes of the paper's operation
 Video tour of the Morning News office space

Text of The Dallas Morning News historical marker from Texas Historic Sites Atlas (Texas Historical Commission)
 Photos inside and outside former Dallas Morning News'' complex

Newspapers published in the Dallas–Fort Worth metroplex
Pulitzer Prize-winning newspapers
Publications established in 1885
1885 establishments in Texas
Daily newspapers published in Texas
Pulitzer Prize for International Reporting winners